Trachypepla minuta is a moth of the family Oecophoridae first described by Alfred Philpott in 1931. It is endemic to New Zealand and has been collected in Auckland. Adults of this species are on the wing in December. It is distinguishable from similar species as it is smaller in size and darker in appearance than other species in the genus Trachypepla.

Taxonomy 
This species was first described in 1931 by Alfred Philpott using a male specimen collected at the Auckland Domain. George Hudson discussed and illustrated this specimen in his 1939 book "A supplement to the butterflies and moths of New Zealand. The male holotype is held at the Auckland War Memorial Museum.

Description

Philpott described this species as follows:

This species is distinguishable from other species in the genus as it is smaller in size as well as darker in appearance.

Distribution
T. minuta is endemic to New Zealand.

Behaviour
The adults of this species is on the wing in December.

References 

Moths described in 1931
Oecophoridae
Taxa named by Alfred Philpott
Moths of New Zealand
Endemic fauna of New Zealand
Endemic moths of New Zealand